USJ 21 is a light rapid transit station in USJ 21 of UEP Subang Jaya, Selangor, Malaysia. The station is located near Main Place Mall. The station serves the nearby USJ 17, USJ 18 and USJ 21 neighbourhoods.

It is operated under the Kelana Jaya LRT system network as found in the station signage. Like most other LRT stations operating in Klang Valley, this station is elevated.

Feeder bus service

External links 
USJ21 LRT station

Kelana Jaya Line
Railway stations opened in 2016
Subang Jaya